Thomas Bullard House is a historic home located near Autryville, Sampson County, North Carolina.  It was built in 1856, and is a two-story, double-pile, transitional Greek Revival / Federal style frame dwelling.  It has a hipped roof, replacement one-story front porch built in the 1950s, and a one-story rear ell.  The interior has a formal, center-hall plan. Also on the property is the contributing smokehouse (1856) and family cemetery (1862-1991).

It was added to the National Register of Historic Places in 2014.

References

Houses on the National Register of Historic Places in North Carolina
Greek Revival houses in North Carolina
Federal architecture in North Carolina
Houses completed in 1856
Houses in Sampson County, North Carolina
National Register of Historic Places in Sampson County, North Carolina